Therevopangonia is a genus of flies in the family Tabanidae.

Species
Therevopangonia insolita Mackerras, 1955

References

Tabanidae
Brachycera genera
Diptera of Australasia